Hristina Arsova (born 7 February 1985) is a Macedonian footballer who plays as a defender for the North Macedonia national team.

International career
Arsova made her debut for the North Macedonia national team on 19 September 2009, coming on as a substitute for Afrodita Salihi against Slovakia.

References

1985 births
Living people
Women's association football defenders
Macedonian women's footballers
North Macedonia women's international footballers